A metanarrative (also meta-narrative and grand narrative) is a narrative about narratives of historical meaning, experience, or knowledge, which offers a society legitimation through the anticipated completion of a (as yet unrealized) master idea.

Etymology 
"Meta" is Greek for "beyond"; "narrative" is a story that is characterized by its telling (it is communicated somehow).

Although first used earlier in the 20th century, the term was brought into prominence by Jean-François Lyotard in 1979, with his claim that the postmodern was characterised precisely by a mistrust of the "grand narratives" (Progress, Enlightenment, Emancipation, Marxism) that had formed an essential part of modernity.

Skepticism
In The Postmodern Condition: A Report on Knowledge (1979), Lyotard highlights the increasing skepticism of the postmodern condition toward the totalizing nature of metanarratives and their reliance on some form of "transcendent and universal truth":

Lyotard and other poststructuralist thinkers (like Foucault) view this as a broadly positive development for a number of reasons. First, attempts to construct grand theories tend to unduly dismiss the naturally existing chaos and disorder of the universe, the power of the individual event.

Sociology.org.uk states that it is unclear whether Lyotard is describing a global condition of skepticism towards metanarratives in postmodernity, or prescribing such skepticism. His critics point out the awkward fact that meta-narratives clearly continue to play a major role in the current postmodern world.

Replacing grand, universal narratives with small, local narratives
Lyotard proposed that metanarratives should give way to petits récits, or more modest and "localized" narratives, which can ''throw off" the grand narrative by bringing into focus the singular event. Borrowing from the works of Wittgenstein and his theory of the "models of discourse", Lyotard constructs his vision of a progressive politics, grounded in the cohabitation of a whole range of diverse and always locally legitimated language-games.

Postmodernists attempt to replace metanarratives by focusing on specific local contexts as well as on the diversity of human experience. They argue for the existence of a "multiplicity of theoretical standpoints" rather than for grand, all-encompassing theories.

Narratology and communication
According to John Stephens and Robyn McCallum, a metanarrative "is a global or totalizing cultural narrative schema which orders and explains knowledge and experience" – a story about a story, encompassing and explaining other "little stories" within conceptual models that assemble the "little stories" into a whole. Postmodern narratives will often deliberately disturb the formulaic expectations such cultural codes provide, pointing thereby to a possible revision of the social code.

In communication and strategic communication, a master narrative (or metanarrative) is a "transhistorical narrative that is deeply embedded in a particular culture". A master narrative is therefore a particular type of narrative, which is defined as a "coherent system of interrelated and sequentially organized stories that share a common rhetorical desire to resolve a conflict by establishing audience expectations according to the known trajectories of its literary and rhetorical form".

The Consortium for Strategic Communication also maintains a website on master narratives.

Others have related metanarratives to masterplots, "recurrent skeletal stories, belonging to cultures and individuals that play a powerful role in questions of identity, values, and the understanding of life".

Criticism of Lyotard's thesis

J. W. Bertens and D. Fokkema argued that, in so far as one of Lyotard's targets was science, he was mistaken in thinking that science relies upon a grand narrative for social and epistemic validation, rather than on the accumulation of many lesser narrative successes.

Lyotard himself also criticised his own thesis as "simply the worst of all my books".

See also

References

Sources
 Jean-François Lyotard. The Postmodern Condition: A Report on Knowledge. Minneapolis: University of Minnesota Press, 1984 [1979], reprint 1997. Translated by Geoff Bennington and Brian Massumi.

Further reading
 David Carr, Time, Narrative, and History (Indiana UP, 1986)
 Geoffrey Bennington, Lyotard: Writing the Event (1988)

External links

A Postmodern Strategy: Language Games

 

Literary criticism
Modernism